Fraud is intentional deception to secure unfair or unlawful gain, or to deprive a victim of a legal right.

Fraud or Frauds may also refer to:
Fraud (book), 2006 non-fiction book
Fraud (film), 2016 conceptual documentary film 
Frauds (film), 1993 Australian film
Frauds (soundtrack), soundtrack of the 1993 film
Fraud (TV series), 2022 Pakistani television series